Nalneesh Neel is an Indian actor who has acted in various Bollywood and Hollywood films. He is best known for his roles in The White Tiger, III Smoking Barrels, Chhichhore, Gulabo Sitabo, Bhor, Fukrey Returns, Raees, and Shuddh Desi Romance.

Early life 
Neel was born in Bisalpur Pilibhit, Uttar Pradesh. After completing his study he moved to Shahjahanpur, where he started doing theatre under the guidance of his mentor Dalip Anand. He played characters in several plays.

Career 
Neel has appeared in Bhor, Raees, Fukrey Returns, Shuddh Desi Romance, Chhichhore and Gulabo Sitabo. He won the Best Performance in the Negative Role at the Caleidoscope Indian Film Festival, Boston in 2020 for his role in the film Bhor. He made his Hollywood debut with The White Tiger directed by Ramin Bahrani. He was highly praised for playing the role of a vitiligo lips in the film.

Neel has acted in various short films including The Foreigner, Acche Din and Umeed

Neel appeared in various advertising campaigns concerning the Indian economy: Prem Ratan Dhan Payo, 5rs ki maut, The case video Must Go On and the NGO advertisement No to Violence, Yes to Love. and commercials including SAMCO Kisan Pipe and Cello Pen Maxtreme.

Neel regularly performs in the theater under his own production SRS Entertainment. He is currently performing in the short solo play Ek Haseena Paanch Diwane based on Harishankar Parsai's story.

Filmography

Film

Upcoming films

Awards and Nominations 
Neel won Critic's Choice Best Actor (Male) for his role in Achchhe Din at Acharya Tulsi Short Film Festival in Mumbai.

In 2020, Nalneesh Neel won the award for Best Performance in A Negative his character of Chamku in the film Bhor at the Caleidoscope Indian Film Festival of Boston.

References

External links 
 

Living people
Indian male film actors
Actors from Uttar Pradesh
People from Pilibhit district
Indian theatre directors
Indian theatre people
1984 births